Censorship in the Philippines refers to the control of certain information in the Philippines.

History

Spanish colonial period
There was government-sanctioned censorship in the Philippines as a Spanish colony which was perceived to be prevalent. However the level of censorship varied depending on the sitting Governor General. Noted publications banned by the colonial authorities were the Noli Me Tángere and El filibusterismo novels of José Rizal which were critical of the Spanish colonial government and the church.

From 1857 to 1883, the Spanish largely regulated the press in the Philippines through the Rules of Printing Matters (Reglamento de Asuntos de Imprenta) under which newspapers were required to obtain a license from the government. This was followed by the Printing Order or Gullón (De policía de
imprenta o Gullón) in 1883 by the Liberal Spanish government at the time which led to the emergence of multiple Philippines newspapers until the end of the Spanish colonial period.

American colonial period
The United States administration introduced laws against sedition and libel in the Philippines in 1901 through the Sedition Act and the Criminal Libel Act. This has led to the closure of El Renacimiento which openly advocated for Philippine independence, advocated the usage of Spanish as an official language, and was critical of Governor General William Howard Taft's policies in 1908.

The Board of Censorship for Moving Pictures (BCMP) was formed on November 27, 1929, through Commonwealth Act No. 3852. By 1930, the first board of the BCMP reviewed 1,249 films for public exhibition, six of which were allowed only with cuts, and two were banned. The BCMP became the Board of Review for Moving Pictures (BRMP) in 1936.

World War II
During the Japanese occupation of the Philippines during World War II, the Japanese banned all publications not for the Japanese audience, save for Manila Tribune, Taliba, and La Vanguardia. Publications by these local newspapers were heavily censored by the Imperial Japanese Army. However underground publications were accessible to Filipinos during this period which allowed the distribution of information not censored by the Japanese.

Post-Commonwealth period
Post-war state censorship of print media is limited as the press functioned as a watchdog of the government. During this period, the Philippine press is known to be the “freest in Asia”. The Board of Review for Moving Pictures (BRMP) regulated cinema from the end of the war until 1961. The BRMP was reorganized as the Board of Censors of Motion Pictures (BCMP) during the administration of President Carlos P. Garcia. BCMP was constituted through Republic Act No. 3060 on June 17, 1961, and was placed under the Office of the President.

Martial Law period

As part of the imposition of Martial Law during the administration of President Ferdinand Marcos in 1972 until the 1980s, the press was heavily regulated and censored. All publications including from foreign news outfits had to be approved by the Department of Public Information. Society news, editorial commentary, and content critical to the Philippine government were among those banned. The government seized control of privately owned print and broadcast media outfits. Only Daily Express and Bulletin Today (Manila Bulletin) were allowed to resume operations among those publications that existed prior to Martial Law. These newspapers, along with the Times Journal, were owned by Marcos cronies and came to be known as the "crony press" and served as mouthpieces for the dictatorship. Books such as Primitivo Mijares' The Conjugal Dictatorship of Ferdinand and Imelda Marcos and Carmen Navarro Pedrosa's The Untold Story of Imelda Marcos were also banned.

The regulations encouraged self-censorship by the press, which were traditionally adversarial towards the government. In the 1980s, an "alternative press" unsanctioned by the government emerged. Among these publications that form part of the alternative press were Jose Burgos' WE Forum and Pahayagang Malaya; Veritas, edited by Felix Bautista and Melinda de Jesus; Raul and Leticia Locsin's Business Day (present-day Business World); Eugenia Apostol and Leticia Magsanoc's Inquirer and Mr. and Ms. Magazine. The phenomenon of samizdat or xerox journalism also proliferated, which involved the dissemination of news clippings, usually from publications abroad that were not checked by the government's censors. These often proliferated through Filipino journalists working for foreign news outfits.

Foreign journalists critical of the regime were often expelled or had their visas denied or revoked. Marcos accused Arnold Zeitlin of the Associated Press of "malicious and false reporting" during his coverage of the fighting between the government forces and Muslim Filipino separatists in Jolo, Sulu. Zeitlin was expelled from the Philippines in 1976. A year later, the government denied the visa application of Bernard Wideman, a news correspondent of The Washington Post and Far Eastern Economic Review. Wideman covered Marcos' seizure of privately-owned companies such as Philippine Airlines and Philippine Cellophane Film Corporation. Wideman's expulsion was eventually reversed by the Immigration Commission.

Like print and broadcast media, film was also heavily regulated during the Martial Law period. Letter of Instruction no. 13 issued on September 29, 1972, prohibited films that incite subversion and rebellion, films that glorify criminals, films that show the use of prohibited drugs, and films that undermine people’s confidence in the government. It also banned films that are contrary to the spirit of Proclamation 1081. President Marcos reorganized the Board of Censors of Motion Pictures as the Board of Review for Motion Pictures and Television (BRMPT) on November 13, 1981, through Executive Order No. 745. He also increased the members of the board through Executive Order 757. The Movie and Television Review and Classification Board (MTRCB) replaced BRMPT on October 5, 1985, through Presidential Decree No. 1986. It was tasked to regulate and classify media, including motion picture and television programs.

Contemporary period (1986–present)
With the advent of the internet in the Philippines, there was debate regarding the necessity of censorship in the 1990s to block cyber pornography in response to reports of Filipinos being prostituted through online means. The issue reached the Senate at the time with Senators Blas Ople and Orlando S. Mercado calling for a hearing on the matter in 1995, and Senator Gregorio Honasan filing a bill as a bid to address the matter.

In 2000, the Roman Catholic Church in the Philippines through the Catholic Bishops' Conference of the Philippines (CBCP) launched cbcpNet, its own internet service provider (ISP) which filters out content depicting pornography, homosexuality, violence and devil worship, for its subscribers. This venture failed due to a CBCP partner fleeing the Philippines which led to debt and legal issues. CBCP World, was introduced in 2002, the CBCP's second attempt to setup its own ISP which also offered filtered online access like its predecessor.

The passing of the Cybercrime Prevention Act in 2012, was a subject of concern by human rights activists especially its provisions on cyberlibel. The law was challenged and the Supreme Court ruled in 2014 that the original author of libelous content is only liable against the law saying that the act of posting libelous content is not a crime. The court also iterated that access to websites can't be restricted by the Department of Justice without a prior court order and that the government could not monitor individuals in "real time" without the same.

In September 2020, the MTRCB proposed the regulation of content distributed through online streaming services including Netflix believing that these content falls under their mandate to regulate and classify "all forms" of motion picture. Such plans raised concerns over censorship.

By medium

Television and film
The Movie and Television Review and Classification Board is responsible for rating television programs, movies and home videos aired in the Philippines. The government agency can classify a movie or television program an X rating, effectively banning the work from public screening. The MTRCB is however criticized for its views on what constitutes obscenity, and is also accused of giving the X rating to materials for political reasons such as Ora Pro Nobis by Lino Brocka, which gained controversy for its allegations of continued human rights violations in the Philippines after the 1986 EDSA revolution.

Internet

The Freedom on the Net 2013 by the Freedom House ranked the Philippines 10th out of 60 countries. It said that it did not receive reports that officials are pressuring bloggers or online journalists to delete content deemed critical to the authorities. However it said that "many news websites are online versions of traditional media which self-censor due to the level of violence against journalists in the Philippines".

It also said that "The government does not require the registration of user information prior to logging online or subscribing to internet and mobile phone services, especially since prepaid services are widely available, even in small neighborhood stores." The same report also stated that the Cybercrime Prevention Act of 2012 negatively affected the state of internet freedom of the country. It has also noted that the internet penetration of the country remains low which it attributes to PLDT's "de facto monopoly" and lack of infrastructure and bureaucratic government regulation. The study says that the monopoly resulted to high broadband subscription fees.

A study released in March 2014 by United States-based, Pew Research Center states that most Filipinos find access to the internet without censorship is important or somewhat important. 35% of the respondents said they found internet access without censorship as "very important", 38% as "somewhat important", 18% "not too important", 6% "not important" and the rest said they don't know or refused to answer.

In 2017, a large number of pornographic websites, including PornHub, Xhamster, and RedTube, were blocked under suspicion of hosting child pornography.

The National Telecommunications Commission (NTC) issued an order in June 2022 for internet service providers to block access to 26 websites that are allegedly "affiliated to and are supporting" the Communist Party of the Philippines, New People's Army, and the National Democratic Front, including the media outlet Bulatlat. A Quezon City court issued an injunction in August 2022 ordering the NTC to unblock Bulatlat's website, citing the news website's rights to be protected by the Constitutional provision on freedom of speech and of the press.

See also
Cybercrime Prevention Act of 2012
Freedom of religion in the Philippines
List of films banned in the Philippines

References